Lauri Törhönen (born 16 August 1947 in Helsinki, Finland) is a Finnish film director. He has directed 13 feature films including Tropic of Ice. He worked in Warren Beatty's Reds as the second assistant director: Finland (as Lauri Torhonen) and in Gorky Park by Michael Apted also as the second assistant director: Finland (as Lauri Torhonen).

Törhönen worked as professor of film art in University of Art and Design Helsinki.

In January 2018, the Finnish national broadcasting service Yle published news of accusations of sexual harassment against Törhönen. The accusations were made by around 20 women, and contain events from the 1980s to the 2000s. Later Törhönen published a brief press release where he apologised his behaviour. In a television interview some weeks later he acknowledged some bad behaviour but denied any allegations of serious sexual harassment.

Partial filmography 
 The Undressing (Riisuminen, 1986)
 Tropic of Ice (Tropic of Ice – Jään kääntöpiiri, 1987)
 Insiders (1989)
 Paradise America (Ameriikan raitti, 1990)
 Abandoned Houses, Empty Homes (Hylätyt talot, autiot pihat, 2000)
 The Border (Raja 1918, 2007)
 The Girls of April (Vares – Huhtikuun tytöt, 2011)
 Garter Snake (Vares – Sukkanauhakäärme, 2011)
 Vares – Uhkapelimerkki (2012)
 Tango of Darkness (Vares – Pimeyden tango, 2012)

Awards
 2001 OCIC Award

References

1947 births
Living people
Artists from Helsinki
Finnish film directors